Raymond Ch'ien Kuo-fung GBS CBE JP (born 26 January 1952 in Tokyo, Japan), also known as Raymond Ch'ien, is a Hong Kong businessman and former politician. "Ch'ien Kuo-fung" literally translates to "money + fruit + abundance" in Chinese.

Career
He is director of The Wharf Ltd. and HSBC; former non-executive chairman of MTR Corporation Limited until 2015 and chairman of CDC Corporation. He was a director of HSBC Holdings until 2007, when he became Chairman of Hang Seng Bank. 

He chairs the Advisory Committee on Corruption of the Independent Commission Against Corruption and the Chairman of the Hong Kong/European Union Business Cooperation Committee, and is a Hong Kong member of the APEC Business Advisory Council. He was also a member of the Executive Council of Hong Kong from 1992 to June 2002 under both British Administration and HKSAR. He was the chairman of St Stephen's College Council.

In January 2013, he was re-appointed MTR Corporation Chairman. He held this position until December 2015.

Honours
He was appointed the Justice of the Peace in 1993; named Commander of the Order of the British Empire in 1994 and awarded the Gold Bauhinia Star Medal in 1999.

References

External link
http://www.mtr.com.hk/eng/investrelation/governance.php

1952 births
Commanders of the Order of the British Empire
Members of the Executive Council of Hong Kong
Hong Kong bankers
Hong Kong chief executives
Hang Seng Bank
HSBC people
Living people
MTR Corporation
The Wharf (Holdings)
Recipients of the Gold Bauhinia Star
Politicians from Tokyo
Members of the Selection Committee of Hong Kong
China Resources people